A pact is a formal agreement. 

Pact, The Pact or PACT may also refer to:

Entertainment
 The Pact (novel), by Jodi Picoult, 1998
 The Pact (2002 film), adaptation of Picoult's The Pact
 The Pact (2003 film), Australian film
 The Pact (2006 film), American documentary 
 The Pact (2012 film), American horror film
 The Pact (2018 Spanish film), Spanish horror thriller film
 The Pact (TV series), American title for Polish series Pakt
 The Pact (British TV series), Welsh drama series
 The Pact, former title of 2018 American comedy film Blockers 
 The Pact (comics), a production of Image Comics
 The Pact (2002 book), a 2002 non-fiction book by The Three Doctors

Organizations
 Parents and Abducted Children Together, UK charity dealing with international child abduction
 Party for Accountability, Competency and Transparency, Canadian political party
 Pratigya Apprenticeship for Community Transformation, an Indian residential program for tribal youth
 Prison Advice and Care Trust, UK charity supporting prisoners and their families
 Producers Alliance for Cinema and Television, UK media trade association
 Protecting American Communities Task Force, group of federal agents established in 2020 by the U.S. Department of Homeland Security
 PACT (Protestant Adoption Society), an Irish adoption organisation

Places
 Pact, Isère, a commune in France
 Puppetry Art Center of Taipei, an art center in Taipei, Taiwan

Science and technology
 PACT (compiler), a series of compilers for the IBM 701 and 704 computers
 Protein ACTivator of the interferon-induced protein kinase, a protein encoded by the PRKRA gene
 Powdered activated carbon treatment, a waste water treatment technology
 Programme of Action for Cancer Therapy, an IAEA project on radiation medicine
 Positioning Advertising Copy Testing, a document detailing features of a Good Copy Testing System
 PACT (interaction design), a structure used to analyse user interfaces

See also
 PACT Act (disambiguation)
 Pakt (disambiguation)
 Covenant (historical)
 Deal with the Devil
 Suicide pact
 Trade pact
 , Including many titles "Pact of ..."
 , Including many titles "The ... Pact"